Lower Guinea may refer to:
 Maritime Guinea, the coastal region of the republic of Guinea.
 in biogeography, a region of coastal tropical forests stretching along the Gulf of Guinea, from Ghana through Benin, Togo, Nigeria, and Cameroon. It is separated from Upper Guinea by the drier Dahomey Gap.
Regions of Africa
Regions of Guinea

See also
Lower Guinean forests
Middle Guinea
Upper Guinea

References

Geography of Guinea